Goodenia halophila is a species of flowering plant in the family Goodeniaceae and is endemic to the northern Australia. It is a delicate annual herb with spatula-shaped, or lance-shaped leaves in a tuft at the base of erect or low-lying flowering stems, and cymes of yellow flowers.

Description

Taxonomy and naming
Goodenia halophila was first formally described in 2002 by David Edward Albrecht in the journal Nuytsia from specimens collected by Peter Latz near Rabbit Flat in the Northern Territory in 1980. The specific epithet (halophila) means "salt-loving", referring to the habitat preference of this goodenia.

Distribution and habitat
This goodenia grows in low-lying saline areas in arid areas of the Northern Territory and in the Great Sandy Desert in Western Australia.

Conservation status
Goodenia halophila is listed as of "least concern" under the Northern Territory Government Territory Parks and Wildlife Conservation Act 1976. but as "Priority Three" by the Government of Western Australia Department of Parks and Wildlife, meaning that it is poorly known and known from only a few locations but is not under imminent threat.

References

halophila
Flora of the Northern Territory
Eudicots of Western Australia
Plants described in 2002
Endemic flora of Australia